MDC's Tower Theater, is one of Miami's oldest cultural landmarks. When it opened in December 1926, it was the finest state-of-the-art theater in the South. It is located on SW Eighth Street and Fifteenth Avenue in Miami, Florida.

History

Robdendon Corporation opened this movie theatre to the public as a Wometco first-run-house in December 1926. On October 3, 1931, after extensive remodeling under the leadership of Robert Law Weed, the theatre re-opened its doors. The exterior was developed in an Art Deco style with a prominent 40-foot steel tower that quickly became a neighborhood landmark. The Theater was now a member of Wolfson-Meyer Theatrical Enterprises of Miami.

During the late fifties and  throughout the sixties, large numbers of Cuban refugees fled to Miami. The area surrounding S.W. Eighth Street - "Calle Ocho" - became a place of new beginnings. For many Cuban families, films at MDC's Tower Theater were an introduction to American culture in addition to pure entertainment. Soon MDC's Tower Theater altered its programming to include English-language films with Spanish subtitles, and eventually Spanish-language films. However, after almost sixty years of operation, MDC's Tower Theater was closed to the public in 1984.

Following another remodeling in 2002, the Theater was turned over to Miami Dade College. Now under the auspices of Miami Film Festival.

In 2011, USA Today declared MDC's Tower Theater "one of the 10 great places to see a movie in splendor" in the newspaper's round-up of the best old-fashioned movie palaces in America.

References
Notes

Bibliography

Buildings and structures in Miami
Art Deco architecture in Florida
Theatres completed in 1926
1926 establishments in Florida